

Molluscs

Bivalves

Arthropods

Insects

Archosauromorphs
 Psittacosaurus gastroliths documented.

Newly named pseudosuchians

Newly named pterosaurs

Newly named non-avian dinosaurs
Data courtesy of George Olshevsky's dinosaur genera list.

Literature on fossil birds

 Storrs Olson: the fossil record of birds

Newly named birds

Lepidosauromorphs

Newly named pleosiosaurs

References

 Bird, R.T. (1985) Bones for Barnum Brown (V.T. Schreiber, Ed.), Texas Christian Univ. Press. Fort Worth, TX. 225 pp.
 Sanders F, Manley K, Carpenter K. Gastroliths from the Lower Cretaceous sauropod Cedarosaurus weiskopfae. In: Tanke D.H, Carpenter K, editors. Mesozoic vertebrate life: new research inspired by the paleontology of Philip J. Currie. Indiana University Press; Bloomington, IN: 2001. pp. 166–180.

 
Paleontology
Paleontology 5